Leighton Road is a main road in Causeway Bay, Hong Kong. It begins east of Causeway Road and ends at the west of the junction with Morrison Hill Road and Canal Road.

History
Part of the road skirts Leighton Hill to its north while part of it runs along Lee Garden (a property of the Lee Hysan family), known as Jardine's Hill (owned by Jardine-Matheson) in early colonial days. The area adjacent to the road is relatively quiet compared to the business centre of East Point of Causeway Bay.

Features
A branch road, Wong Nai Chung Road leads to the Happy Valley Racecourse and the upscale residential area of Happy Valley.

 No. 8. Crowne Plaza Hong Kong Causeway Bay Hotel, an InterContinental Hotels Group-franchised hotel, has been located there since 2009.
 No. 66. Po Leung Kuk headquarters
 No. 77. Leighton Centre, owned by Hysan Development Company, is a grade A office building
 No. 101. Zoroastrian Building. A first building was erected in the 1930s. The current building was built in 1993.
 No. 111. Lee Garden Six
 No. 133. Lanson Place Hotel
 No. 140. St. Paul's Convent School
 Craigengower Cricket Club

Gallery

See also
 List of streets and roads in Hong Kong

References

Causeway Bay
Wan Chai
Roads on Hong Kong Island